Benserazide is a peripherally acting aromatic L-amino acid decarboxylase or DOPA decarboxylase inhibitor, which is unable to cross the blood–brain barrier.

It is on the World Health Organization's List of Essential Medicines.

Indications 

It is used in the management of Parkinson's disease in combination with L-DOPA (levodopa) as co-beneldopa (BAN), under the brand names Madopar in the UK and Prolopa in Canada, both made by Roche. Benserazide is not approved for use in the US; carbidopa is used, instead, for the same purpose. These combinations are also used for the treatment of restless leg syndrome.

Pharmacology 

Levodopa is a precursor to the neurotransmitter dopamine, which is administered to increase its levels in the central nervous system. However, most levodopa is decarboxylated to dopamine before it reaches the brain, and since dopamine is unable to cross the blood–brain barrier, this translates to little therapeutic gain with strong peripheral side effects.

Benserazide inhibits the aforementioned decarboxylation, and since it cannot cross the blood–brain barrier itself, this allows dopamine to build up solely in the brain, instead. Adverse effects caused by peripheral dopamine, such as vasoconstriction, nausea, and arrhythmia, are minimized. However, benserazide cannot reduce the centrally mediated side effects of levodopa, particularly dyskinesia.

Benserazide has little therapeutic effect on its own, and its effect occurs synergically in combination with levodopa.

The enzyme inhibited by benzerazide catalyzes many different decarboxylations. The same effect of concentrating the conversion of levodopa into dopamine to the central nervous system can be achieved with the following decarboxylations being confined to the central nervous system:
5-HTP to serotonin
Tryptophan to tryptamine
Phenylalanine to phenethylamine
L-tyrosine to tyramine

Centrally mediated side effects of higher levels of neuro- and trace amine-transmitters may worsen in combination with monoamine oxidase inhibitors.

References 

Pyrogallols
Hydrazides
Aromatic L-amino acid decarboxylase inhibitors
Antiparkinsonian agents
Peripherally selective drugs